Hervé Bromberger (11 November 1918 – 25 November 1993) was a French film director and screenwriter. He directed 16 films between 1951 and 1982. His 1951 film Paris Vice Squad was entered into the 1951 Cannes Film Festival.

Selected filmography
 Paris Vice Squad (1951)
 Alone in Paris (1951)
 Wild Fruit (1954)
 Three Fables of Love (1962)
  (1966)
 Figaro-ci, Figaro-là (1972)

References

External links

1918 births
1993 deaths
French film directors
French male screenwriters
20th-century French screenwriters
20th-century French male writers